The Shadow of Heaven is the debut studio album by Money. It was released by Bella Union on August 26, 2013.

Reception

The Shadow of Heaven received positive reviews from critics. On Metacritic, the album holds a score of 78/100 based on 13 reviews, indicating "generally favorable reviews".

Track listing

References

2013 debut albums
Money (band) albums
Bella Union albums